is a men's volleyball team based in Fuchu city, Tokyo, Japan. It plays in V.Premier League. The owner of the club is NEC.

History
The club was founded in 1938.

Honours
Japan Volleyball League/V.League/V.Premier League
Champion (4): 1991, 1993, 1995 and 1998
Runners-up (4): 1989, 1992, 1997 and 2004
Kurowashiki All Japan Volleyball Tournament
Champions (7): 1992, 1994, 1994, 1997, 1999, 2003 and 2007
Runners-up (1): 2005
Emperor's Cup
Champion (0):

League results

Japanese volleyball teams
Volleyball clubs established in 1945
Sports teams in Tokyo
NEC Corporation
1945 establishments in Japan
Men's volleyball teams